Kiriki-Ulita is a rural locality (a village) in Spasskoye Rural Settlement, Vologodsky District, Vologda Oblast, Russia. The population was 5 as of 2002. There are 18 streets.

Geography 
Kiriki-Ulita is located 7 km southwest of Vologda (the district's administrative centre) by road. Boltino is the nearest rural locality.

References 

Rural localities in Vologodsky District